Below is the milestones of Turkish radio TV broadcasting.  The oldest broadcaster in Turkey is TRT, the public broadcaster, which now broadcasts
6 nationwide, 6 regional, 1 local and 2 international radio channels as well as 
11 TV nationwide and 2 international TV channels. 
But after the 1990s, many private radio and TV companies began broadcasting, some nationwide and some local.

See also
Radio and television technology in Turkey

References

Mass media in Turkey
Television in Turkey
Turkey
Turkey
Lists of mass media in Turkey